Enrique de Gandía (February 1, 1906, in Buenos Aires – July 18, 2000) was an Argentine historian, author of over a hundred books.

He taught, as a professor of School of Fine Arts (1948), the University of Morón (1960) and the University of Belgrano (1967), being co-founder of the latter two. He also held the chair of Political Science at the Kennedy University (1991). In 1948 he was director of the Buenos Aires Municipal Museum (now the Historical Museum of Buenos Aires "Cornelio de Saavedra").

His career was recognized with the designation as a full member of the National Academies of History (1930), Moral and Political Sciences (1938 ), Geography (1985), and the National Academy of Sciences (1987). In 1933, he co-founded the National Institute of San Martin. In 1930, he co-founded the Paraguayan Institute of Historical Research, this institution and the Institute of History and Geography of Paraguay it would appoint an honorary member. He received numerous awards, including Konex 1984, the appointment of Government of Portugal as Commander of the Order of Prince Henry the Navigator (1991), honorary doctorates of the National University of Asuncion and University of the Basque Country.

He was considered by Paul Gallez, member and initiator of the Argentine School of Protocartography. He was the first to theorise that the fourth peninsula of Asia (called sometimes Cattigara Peninsula) in ancient maps was South America in his book Primitivos navegantes vascos.

Publications 
Partial list of the works published by Gandía:

 Historia del Gran Chaco - 1929
 Límites de las gobernaciones sudamericanas en el siglo XVI - 1933
 Los derechos del Paraguay sobre el Chaco Boreal en el siglo XVI - 1935
 Historia de la República Argentina en el Siglo XIX - 1940
 Historia de Cristóbal Colón - 1942
 Primitivos navegantes vascos - 1942
 Buenos Aires colonial - 1957
 Bolívar y la libertad - 1959
 Nicolás Avellaneda: Sus ideas y su tiempo - 1985
 Simón Bolívar: Su pensamiento político - 1984
 Historia de las ideas políticas en la Argentina - 1988
 Nueva historia de América, la libertad y la antilibertad - 1988
 Nueva historia del descubrimiento de América - 1987
 Américo Vespucci y sus cinco viajes al nuevo mundo - 1990

See also 
 Dick Edgar Ibarra Grasso
 Paul Gallez
 Basque sailors
 Pre-Columbian trans-oceanic contact

External links 
 Fundación Konex (in Spanish)
 Academia Porteña del Lunfardo (in Spanish)
 Homenaje al Dr. Enrique de Gandía - Universidad Argentina J.F. Kennedy (in Spanish)
 South America on ancient, medieval and Renaissance maps

1906 births
2000 deaths
Writers from Buenos Aires
20th-century Argentine historians
Argentine male writers
Burials at La Chacarita Cemetery
Male non-fiction writers